Alessandro da Conceição Pinto (born 21 September 1977 in Campos dos Goytacazes), better known as just Alessandro, is a Brazilian footballer who plays for Operário as a right back.

Honours
Vasco da Gama
 Série A: 1997
 Taça Guanabara: 1998
 Taça Rio: 1998
 Campeonato Carioca: 1998

Atlético Paranaense
 Campeonato Paranaense: 2001, 2002
 Série A: 2001

Botafogo
 Taça Rio: 2007, 2008
 Taça Guanabara: 2009

External links 
 CBF 
 
 yahoo 
 

1977 births
Living people
Brazilian footballers
Americano Futebol Clube players
CR Vasco da Gama players
Campo Grande Atlético Clube players
Ituano FC players
Mirassol Futebol Clube players
Bangu Atlético Clube players
Club Athletico Paranaense players
Clube Atlético Mineiro players
Associação Desportiva São Caetano players
Botafogo de Futebol e Regatas players
Botafogo Futebol Clube (SP) players
Clube Náutico Capibaribe players
Clube Atlético Metropolitano players
Campeonato Brasileiro Série A players
People from Campos dos Goytacazes
Association football defenders
Sportspeople from Rio de Janeiro (state)